The ITF Men's World Tennis Tour (formerly ITF Men's Circuit) is a series of professional tennis tournaments held around the world that are organized by the International Tennis Federation.  The tour represents the lowest rung of the men's professional tennis ladder.  ITF tournaments are incorporated into the ATP rankings, enabling young professionals to progress on to the ATP Challenger Tour and ultimately the full ATP Tour.  Nearly every professional player has spent some time on the ITF Men's World Tennis Tour.

Format
Originally, the ITF Men's Circuit consisted of satellite tournaments, each of which took place over four weeks. However, in the late 1990s, the ITF introduced Futures tournaments, allowing for greater flexibility in the organization of the tournaments for national associations, and participation in tournaments for players. Over time, the ratio of Futures tournaments to satellites increased until 2007, when satellites were eliminated entirely.

Futures tournaments allow for players to win career titles and improve their rankings. Futures are held in both singles and doubles and last one week. As of 2017, the prize fund for each tournament is either US$15,000 or US$25,000. Some tournaments also provide housing for participants. Futures usually have sizable qualifying draws, which allow unranked players to enter tournaments and earn ATP ranking points.

In 2019, reforms were made to the circuit, renaming it the ITF World Tennis Tour as a new umbrella name for former Pro Circuit and Junior Circuit tournaments and will serve as the player pathway between the junior game and the elite levels of professional tennis. The launch of the tour is the culmination of a series of ITF reforms designed to support talented junior players in their progression to the senior game, and target the prize money effectively at professional tournaments to enable more players to make a living.

ATP ranking points

2018 season

2019 season

2020 and 2021 seasons

2022 season and onwards

Seasons
2010 ITF Men's Circuit
2011 ITF Men's Circuit
2012 ITF Men's Circuit
2013 ITF Men's Circuit
2014 ITF Men's Circuit
2015 ITF Men's Circuit
2016 ITF Men's Circuit
2017 ITF Men's Circuit
2018 ITF Men's Circuit
2019 ITF Men's World Tennis Tour
2020 ITF Men's World Tennis Tour
2021 ITF Men's World Tennis Tour
2022 ITF Men's World Tennis Tour

See also
ITF Women's World Tennis Tour

References

External links
ITF Men's Circuit

 
Tennis tours and series
International Tennis Federation
Recurring sporting events established in 1998
Men's tennis tournaments